Facts of Life is the fifth studio album by American musician Bobby Womack. The album was released on June 8, 1973, by United Artists Records. The album raced to No. 6 on the US Billboard R&B chart. It also charted at No. 37 on the Billboard Pop chart. The album included the hit single "Nobody Wants You When You're Down and Out" (which charted No. 2 on the Billboard R&B Singles chart).Recorded in Muscle Shoals, Alabama.

Track listing

Personnel
Bobby Womack - guitar, vocals, string and horn arrangements
Dave Turner, Jimmy Johnson, Pete Carr - guitar
David Hood, Jerry Masters - bass
Barry Beckett, Clayton Ivey - keyboards
Roger Hawkins - drums
Technical
Jerry Masters, Kerry McNab, Christina Hersch, Steve Melton - engineer
Mike Salisbury - art direction, design
Philip Hays - cover illustration

Charts

Singles

References

1973 albums
Bobby Womack albums
United Artists Records albums
Albums produced by Bobby Womack